Hanson County is a county in the U.S. state of South Dakota. As of the 2020 census, the population was 3,461. Its county seat is Alexandria. The county was founded in 1871 and organized in 1873. It was named for Joseph R. Hanson, clerk of the first legislature.

Hanson County is part of the Mitchell, SD Micropolitan Statistical Area. The county is somewhat unique among those in the United States in that there are no officially registered airports within the county borders.

Geography
The terrain of Hanson County consists of low rolling hills; its area is mostly devoted to agriculture. The James River flows southeastward through the lower western part of the county. The terrain slopes toward the river basin on both sides, and generally gently slopes to the south.

It is the third-smallest county in South Dakota by area.

Major highways

 Interstate 90
 South Dakota Highway 25
 South Dakota Highway 38
 South Dakota Highway 42
 South Dakota Highway 262

Adjacent counties

 Miner County - north
 McCook County - east
 Hutchinson County - south
 Davison County - west
 Sanborn County - northwest

Demographics

2000 census
As of the 2000 United States Census there were 3,139 people, 1,115 households, and 848 families in the county. The population density was 7 people per square mile (3/km2). There were 1,218 housing units at an average density of 3 per square mile (1/km2). The racial makeup of the county was 99.52% White, 0.10% Native American, 0.13% Asian, 0.03% Pacific Islander, 0.03% from other races, and 0.19% from two or more races. 0.10% of the population were Hispanic or Latino of any race. Hanson County was mentioned as an "Extreme Whitopia" in Rich Benjamin's book, Searching for Whitopia.

There were 1,115 households, out of which 34.40% had children under the age of 18 living with them, 70.40% were married couples living together, 3.70% had a female householder with no husband present, and 23.90% were non-families. 21.70% of all households were made up of individuals, and 11.60% had someone living alone who was 65 years of age or older. The average household size was 2.82 and the average family size was 3.33.

The county population contained 29.50% under the age of 18, 7.70% from 18 to 24, 26.10% from 25 to 44, 21.80% from 45 to 64, and 14.90% who were 65 years of age or older. The median age was 36 years. For every 100 females, there were 100.30 males. For every 100 females age 18 and over, there were 99.20 males.

The median income for a household in the county was $33,049, and the median income for a family was $39,500. Males had a median income of $27,112 versus $20,216 for females. The per capita income for the county was $14,778. About 12.50% of families and 16.60% of the population were below the poverty line, including 23.30% of those under age 18 and 15.30% of those age 65 or over.

2010 census
As of the 2010 United States Census, there were 3,331 people, 1,045 households, and 793 families in the county. The racial makeup of the county was 98.6% white, 0.3% Asian, 0.3% American Indian, 0.2% from other races, and 0.5% from two or more races. Those of Hispanic or Latino origin made up 0.5% of the population. In terms of ancestry, 63.7% were German, 10.8% were Irish, 6.2% were English, 5.2% were Norwegian, and 4.0% were American.

Of the 1,045 households, 35.0% had children under the age of 18 living with them, 68.8% were married couples living together, 3.5% had a female householder with no husband present, 24.1% were non-families, and 21.7% of all households were made up of individuals. The average household size was 2.69 and the average family size was 3.14. The median age was 35.5 years.

The median income for a household in the county was $46,556 and the median income for a family was $52,425. Males had a median income of $38,088 versus $23,750 for females. The per capita income for the county was $21,391. About 13.8% of families and 13.7% of the population were below the poverty line, including 13.6% of those under age 18 and 13.8% of those age 65 or over.

Communities

Cities
 Alexandria (county seat)
 Emery

Towns
 Farmer
 Fulton

Census-designated places 

 Millbrook Colony
 Oak Lane Colony
 Rockport Colony
 Rosedale Colony

Unincorporated community
 Epiphany, partial

Government

Townships

Beulah
Edgerton
Emery
Fairview
Hanson
Jasper
Plano
Rosedale
Springlake
Taylor
Wayne
Worthen

Politics
Hanson County voters tend to vote Republican. Since 1936, they have selected the Republican Party candidate in 65% of national elections.

See also
 National Register of Historic Places listings in Hanson County, South Dakota

References

External links

 

 
1873 establishments in Dakota Territory
Mitchell, South Dakota micropolitan area
Populated places established in 1873